Durrel Arden Woolsey (June 12, 1926 – May 13, 2019) was a general authority of the Church of Jesus Christ of Latter-day Saints (LDS Church) from 1990 to 1995. He was a member of the Second Quorum of the Seventy.

Woolsey was born in Escalante, Utah to W. Arden Woolsey and his wife, Ruby Riddle. Durrel Woolsey lived in Escalante until age 16 when he moved with his family to Cedar City, Utah. After graduating from high school in the spring of 1944, Woolsey joined the United States Navy. He was stationed in the Pacific theatre and his ship was attacked multiple times by Kamikaze planes.

In 1946, Woolsey married LaRae Wood, who he had met in high school, in the St. George Temple. They then moved to Trona, California and later to Taft, California, where Woolsey was a counselor to a bishop for ten years. He later moved to Stockton, California. He served there for eight years in the stake presidency and another eight years as stake president.

At various times, Woolsey studied at the University of the Pacific in Stockton and also at Princeton University. Woolsey worked for several years for Standard Oil Company, and in 1970 established the independent Woolsey Oil Company.

At the time he was called as a general authority, Woolsey was serving as president of the LDS Church's Arizona Tempe Mission.  After he was a general authority, he served as president of the Oakland California Temple from 1996 to 1999.

Woolsey and his wife are the parents of three children. Woolsey died at his home on May 13, 2019.

References

"Elder Durrel A. Woolsey Of the Seventy", Ensign, May 1990
"New temple presidents", Church News June 26, 1996

1926 births
People from Cedar City, Utah
United States Navy personnel of World War II
American Mormon missionaries in the United States
American general authorities (LDS Church)
University of the Pacific (United States) alumni
Princeton University alumni
People from Stockton, California
Mission presidents (LDS Church)
Members of the Second Quorum of the Seventy (LDS Church)
Temple presidents and matrons (LDS Church)
2019 deaths
20th-century Mormon missionaries
People from Taft, California
Woolsey family
Latter Day Saints from Utah
Latter Day Saints from California